Nhơn Hội Bridge is a bridge in Vietnam, connecting the city of Qui Nhơn to the Phương Mai Peninsula. The bridge was inaugurated in 2006 and was the longest sea bridge in Vietnam with a length of 2477.3 metres, and width of 14.5 metres. The bridge took three years to construct and opened on December 22, 2006.
It cut the road distance from Qui Nhơn City to Nhon Hoi Economic Zone from 60 km (via Tuy Phước District) to only 7 km.

References

External links
tim.vietbao.vn

Road bridges in Vietnam
Buildings and structures in Bình Định province
Bridges completed in 2006